NGC 434 is an intermediate spiral galaxy of type SAB(s)ab located in the constellation Tucana. It was discovered on October 28, 1834 by John Herschel. It was described by Dreyer as "bright, small, round, pretty suddenly bright middle."

References

External links
 

0433
18341028
Tucana (constellation)
Intermediate spiral galaxies
004325